Sergey Yemelyanov (born 19 May 1995) is a Kazakhstani canoeist. He competed in the men's C-2 1000 metres event at the 2020 Summer Olympics.

References

External links
 

1995 births
Living people
Kazakhstani male canoeists
Olympic canoeists of Kazakhstan
Canoeists at the 2020 Summer Olympics
People from Karaganda Region
Asian Games medalists in canoeing
Canoeists at the 2014 Asian Games
Canoeists at the 2018 Asian Games
Medalists at the 2014 Asian Games
Medalists at the 2018 Asian Games
Asian Games silver medalists for Kazakhstan